James Martin Lewis (born October 12, 1955) is an American former professional baseball pitcher. He played during four seasons in Major League Baseball for the Seattle Mariners, New York Yankees, and Minnesota Twins.

Seattle Mariners
Lewis was signed by the Mariners as an amateur free agent in 1977 and played his first professional season with their Class A-Advanced Stockton Mariners in 1978, and his last with Seattle and their Triple-A Calgary Cannons in 1985.

New York Yankees
On November 1, 1979 Lewis was traded, along with Ruppert Jones, to the New York Yankees for Rick Anderson, Jim Beattie, Juan Beniquez, and Jerry Narron.  He played one game for them in 1982.

Minnesota Twins
After the 1982 season, Lewis was drafted by the Minnesota Twins in the 1982 minor league draft, and played 6 games for them in 1983.

Seattle Mariners (second stint)
On February 21, 1984 Lewis re-signed with the Seattle Mariners after becoming a free agent after the 1983 season.  After appearing in 2 games during the 1985 season, he was released.

References

External links
, or Retrosheet, or Pura Pelota (Venezuelan Winter League)

1955 births
Living people
American expatriate baseball players in Canada
Baseball players from Miami
Bellingham Mariners players
Calgary Cannons players
Columbus Clippers players
Major League Baseball pitchers
Miami Dade College alumni
Miami Dade Sharks baseball players
Minnesota Twins players
New York Yankees players
Salt Lake City Gulls players
Seattle Mariners players
Spokane Indians players
South Carolina Gamecocks baseball players
Stockton Mariners players
Tiburones de La Guaira players
American expatriate baseball players in Venezuela
Toledo Mud Hens players